Claudia Pfrengle (née Leistner, born 15 April 1965) is a German former figure skater. She is a two-time World silver medalist and the 1989 European champion.

Career 
Leistner was a roller skater before taking up ice skating. In the 1981–82 season, she landed on the German senior national podium for the first time, taking the silver medal behind Manuela Ruben. Making her senior ISU Championship debut, she placed fifth at the 1982 European Championships in Lyon and fourth at the 1982 World Championships in Copenhagen.

With her outstanding jumping ability, she went on to become European champion in 1989 and a two-time silver medalist at the World Championships (1983 and 1989). She trained in Mannheim, initially being coached by Günter Zöller and later by Ondrej Nepela and Martin Skotnicky.

She represented West Germany (the Federal Republic of Germany and the Mannheimer ERC club.

Personal life 
Claudia Leister was born in Ludwigshafen, Germany. She is married to Stefan Pfrengle, a German national pair skating champion. They have a daughter named Julia Pfrengle, who also competed in figure skating, and a son named Yannik.

Results

References
 Deutsche Eislauf Union (DEU) 
 Eissportmagazin (several issues) 
 Pirouette (several Issues) 
 Results: ISU

1965 births
Living people
German female single skaters
Figure skaters at the 1984 Winter Olympics
Figure skaters at the 1988 Winter Olympics
Olympic figure skaters of West Germany
World Figure Skating Championships medalists
European Figure Skating Championships medalists
Sportspeople from Ludwigshafen